David of Sassoun ( Sasuntsi Davit also spelled David of Sasun) is the main hero of Armenia's national epic Daredevils of Sassoun, who drove Arab Egyptian invaders out of Armenia.

Background 
The Daredevils of Sassoun (also known as after its main hero David of Sassoun) is an Armenian national epic poem recounting David's exploits. As an oral history, it dates from the 8th century, and was first put in written form in 1873 by Garegin Srvandztiants. The epic was transmitted orally between generations around the geographical area surrounding Lake Van, and particularly in around Sassoun.

He also published other ethnographic books.

David of Sassoun is the name of only one of the four acts, but due to the popularity of the character, the entire epic is known to the public as David of Sassoun. The epic's full name is Sasna Tsrer (The Daredevils of Sassoun).

In 1902, the prominent Armenian poet and writer Hovhannes Tumanyan penned a poem of the same name retelling the story of the David of Sassoun in a more modern language.

In 2010, an animated film was produced called Sasna Tsrer, directed by Arman Manaryan, covering the first three cycles of Daredevils of Sassoun. The 80-minute animated film took 8 years to create.

In 2012, UNESCO included the epic in their Intangible Cultural Heritage List.

References

Armenian culture
Epic poems
Fictional Armenian people
Medieval Armenia
David of Sasun